Odd-Karl Stangnes (born 28 October 1968) is a Norwegian football coach and former player, who is currently the manager for the Swedish club IFK Luleå. A defender during his active career, Stangnes played for two clubs in the Norwegian Premier League.

Playing career
Hailing from Skjervøy, his career began in Skjervøy IK, where he played from 1985 to 1996 except for the season 1991 when he played in Strømmen IF and the seasons 1994-95 in Nordreisa. He then played in the Norwegian Premier League with Bodø/Glimt and Lyn, and in the First Division (second tier) with Lyn, FK Lofoten (on loan) and Skeid. His last club was Ull/Kisa, which he left midway through the 2007 season.

References

1968 births
Living people
People from Skjervøy
Norwegian footballers
Strømmen IF players
FK Bodø/Glimt players
Lyn Fotball players
FK Lofoten players
Ullensaker/Kisa IL players
Eliteserien players
Norwegian First Division players
Norwegian football managers
Norwegian expatriate football managers
Association football defenders
Sportspeople from Troms og Finnmark